Kim Tae-seok (born 4 September 1946) is a South Korean former sports shooter. He competed in the trap event at the 1972 Summer Olympics.

References

1946 births
Living people
South Korean male sport shooters
Olympic shooters of South Korea
Shooters at the 1972 Summer Olympics
Place of birth missing (living people)
Asian Games medalists in shooting
Shooters at the 1994 Asian Games
Asian Games bronze medalists for South Korea
Medalists at the 1994 Asian Games
20th-century South Korean people
21st-century South Korean people